Venice Municipal Airport  is a city managed public-use airport located  south of the central business district of Venice, a city in Sarasota County, Florida, United States.

History 
The airport was built during the 1940s by the United States Army Air Forces and served as a military flight training facility.   It also was used by Air Transport Command to deliver US-built aircraft destined for Britain under Lend-lease from the factories on the West Coast or for assignment to selected British pilots.  Some of the aircraft were partially disassembled and prepared for being loaded on board ships for the trip across the Atlantic Ocean.

After World War II, the U.S. government gave airport control to the City of Venice, naming the city the airport sponsor through various federal grant assurances.

After the September 11 attacks of 2001, local, state, and national authorities discovered that three of the 9/11 terrorists, Mohamed Atta, Marwan al-Shehhi, and Ziad Jarrah, had all enrolled at the Huffman Aviation flight training school at VNC for general aviation flight training.

Facilities and aircraft 

For the 12-month period ending October 21, 2008, the airport had 172,645 aircraft operations, an average of 473 per day: 99% general aviation, <1% air taxi and <1% military. At that time there were 214 aircraft based at this airport: 181 single-engine, 28 multi-engine, 3 jet and 2 helicopter.

It is also the base of FFTC (Florida Flight Training Center)  that offers pilot training to local and international students. Self-service aviation fuel, as well as aircraft maintenance services are provided by FFM (Florida Flight Maintenance).

Suncoast Air Center, located just west of the approach end of Runway 23, is the primary fixed-base operator (FBO) and provides ground support and aviation services to aircraft that use the airfield.  They offer both Avgas and JetA fuels, with Avgas available via full or self-service. 3

Sarasota Avionics International maintains its headquarters in a 10,000 SF hangar on the northwest side of the airport.

There is one restaurant located at the airport. The Suncoast Cafe is housed within Suncoast Air Center's FBO terminal and is open for breakfast and lunch.

References

External links 
 Official website
 

Airports in Florida
Transportation buildings and structures in Sarasota County, Florida
1940s establishments in Florida